Gadimyxa is a genus of myxozoans.

Species
The World Register of Marine Species includes the following species in the genus:
 Gadimyxa arctica Køie, Karlsbakk & Nylund, 2007
 Gadimyxa atlantica Køie, Karlsbakk & Nylund, 2007
 Gadimyxa sphaerica Køie, Karlsbakk & Nylund, 2007

References

Parvicapsulidae
Cnidarian genera